Riebiņi is a village in Riebiņi Parish, Preiļi Municipality in the Latgale region of Latvia.

History
The village was a shtetl, and most of the inhabitants were Jewish. According to the census of 1897, there were 533 Jews living in the village (91% of the total population).  In the beginning of the 20th century, many of the Jews left for Israel or the United States, and in 1935, Jews constituted 68% of the total population.

At the end of August 1941, Latvian civil defense police (reportedly - former members of the Aizsargi) arrested Jews and locked them into the synagogues. Then they were moved to Ribiniški Forest (4 km. northwest of the shtetl) and murdered there in a mass execution. There were some local inhabitants from Solutions district who took part in the massacre and several Germans who watched it.

References

Towns and villages in Latvia
Shtetls
Jewish Latvian history
Holocaust locations in Latvia
Preiļi Municipality
Latgale